Argogorytes is a genus of wasps in the family Crabronidae, with 31  known species. The genus is found around the world, with the exception of tropical Africa and Antarctica.

Worldwide species
These 31 species belong to the genus Argogorytes:

 Argogorytes areatus (Taschenberg, 1875) i c g
 Argogorytes basalis (F. Smith, 1860) i c g
 Argogorytes bismarckianus Tsuneki, 1982 i c g
 Argogorytes caerulescens (R. Turner, 1914) i c g
 Argogorytes carbonarius (F. Smith, 1856) i c g
 Argogorytes clypealis R. Bohart, 2000 i c g
 Argogorytes constrictus (F. Smith, 1859) i c g
 Argogorytes cruciger (Hacker and Cockerell, 1922) i c g
 Argogorytes fairmairei (Handlirsch, 1893) i c g
 Argogorytes fargeii (Shuckard, 1837) i g
 Argogorytes fuliginosus Tsuneki, 1968 i c g
 Argogorytes hispanicus (Mercet, 1906) i c g
 Argogorytes matangensis (R. Turner, 1914) i c g
 Argogorytes mexicalis R. Bohart, 2000 i c g
 Argogorytes mystaceus (Linnaeus, 1761) i c g
 Argogorytes nigrifrons (F. Smith, 1856) i c g b
 Argogorytes nipponis Tsuneki, 1963 i c g
 Argogorytes palawanensis Tsuneki, 1976 i c g
 Argogorytes parkeri R. Bohart, 2000 i c g
 Argogorytes porteri R. Bohart, 2000 i c g
 Argogorytes quadrangulus R. Bohart, 2000 i c g
 Argogorytes rubrosignatus (R. Turner, 1915) i c g
 Argogorytes rufomixtus (R. Turner, 1914) i c g
 Argogorytes sapellonis (C. Baker, 1907) i c g
 Argogorytes secernendus (R. Turner, 1915) i c g
 Argogorytes similicolor (Dow, 1933) i c g
 Argogorytes stenopygus (Handlirsch, 1895) i c g
 Argogorytes tonkinensis (Yasumatsu, 1943) i c g
 Argogorytes tristis Tsuneki, 1982 i c g
 Argogorytes umbratilis R. Bohart, 2000 i c g
 Argogorytes vagus (F. Smith, 1859) i c g

Data sources: i = ITIS, c = Catalogue of Life, g = GBIF, b = Bugguide.net

References

External links
 Catalog of Sphecidae California Academy of Sciences Institute of Biodiversity
Argogorytes images at  Consortium for the Barcode of Life

Crabronidae
Hymenoptera genera
Hymenoptera of South America
Taxa named by William Harris Ashmead